Po Lam (Chinese: 寶琳 or 寶林) is a neighbourhood in northern Tseung Kwan O, New Territories. An MTR station with the same name, Tseung Kwan O Village, Yau Yue Wan Village, King Lam Estate, and Po Lam Estate are located there.

Name 
Po Lam is named after one of the first roads in Tseung Kwan O, the Po Lam Road, whose name was taken from the Chinese translation of the first name of Barbara B. Whitener (寶琳), Rev. Sterling H. Whitener's wife. Rev. Whitener was a missionary based at the Haven of Hope Tuberculosis Sanatorium (now Haven of Hope Hospital) at the time. When Po Lam Estate was under planning, it was named "寶林邨", with a different second character but pronounced in the same way. The Po Lam MTR station, on the contrary, used "琳". Government documents have used both names, referring to the area as "寶琳" in a brochure issued by the Planning Department, but also using "林" for the Po Lam Sports Centre within Po Lam Estate. Residents generally use both name interchangeably.

History 
Same as Hang Hau, Po Lam was developed as part of the first phase of the Tseung Kwan O New Town. Its first population intake came in 1988 with the opening of Po Lam Estate. Before 2002, there was no railway access to or from Po Lam. The Tseung Kwan O line, including Po Lam station, opened in August 2002.

In addition to the new town area, two villages, Tseung Kwan O Village and Yau Yue Wan Village, are also considered part of Po Lam, although their histories date back to long before the Tseung Kwan O New Town was conceived.

Demographics 
Po Lam is designated Tertiary Planning Units 836 in the 2016 Population By-census. It is home to 88,272 people, where major ethnic groups are Chinese (95.2%), Indonesians (2.3%) and Filipino (1.5%). Most households live in subsidised home ownership housing (such as Home Ownership Scheme and Sandwich Class Housing Scheme projects) and private housing.

Housing

Public housing 
 Po Lam Estate. The second character ("林", Lam) is different from the one in the neighbourhood's name
 King Lam Estate

Home Ownership Scheme housing 
 Yan Ming Court
 Ying Ming Court
 Ho Ming Court

Others 
 The Pinnacle (developed by the Hong Kong Housing Society under the Sandwich Class Housing Scheme)
 Radiant Towers (developed by the Hong Kong Housing Society under the Sandwich Class Housing Scheme)
 Verbena Heights (developed by the Hong Kong Housing Society under the Flat-for-Sale Scheme)

Private housing 
 Well On Garden
 Finery Park
 Serenity Place
 Metro City Phases 1 to 3

Education

Primary schools 

 King Lam Catholic Primary School (subsidised)
 Lok Sin Tong Lau Tak Primary School (subsidised)
 Shun Tak Fraternal Association Leung Kit Wah Primary School (subsidised)
 Po Leung Kuk Luk Hing Too Primary School (Direct Subsidy Scheme)
 Sheng Kung Hui Tseung Kwan O Kei Tak Primary School (subsidised)
 Tung Wah Group of Hospitals Wong Yee Jar Jat Memorial Primary School (subsidised)

Secondary schools 

 Carmel Divine Grace Foundation Secondary School (subsidised)
 Ma Kam Ming Charitable Foundation Ma Chan Duen Hey Memorial College (subsidised)
 Shun Tak Fraternal Association Cheng Yu Tung Secondary School (subsidised)
 Tseung Kwan O Government Secondary School (government)
 Tung Wah Group of Hospitals Lui Yun Choy Memorial College (subsidised)
 Yan Chai Hospital Lan Chi Pat Memorial Secondary School (subsidised)
 Wellington Educational Organisation Chang Pui Chung Memorial School (subsidised)
 King Ling College (subsidised)
 Po Leung Kuk Laws Foundation College (Direct Subsidy Scheme)

Recreation 
Po Lam hosts a number of public amenities, including the Tseung Kwan O Sports Centre, the Tseung Kwan O Public Swimming Pool and the Tseung Kwan O Public Library, all of which are located close to each other. Also in close proximity to the trio is Po Hong Park, where the annual Lunar New Year Fair takes place. These facilities and the Po Tsui Park, situated next to Po Lam Estate, are all managed by the Leisure and Cultural Services Department.

The neighbourhood is also home to the Metro City Plaza, claimed to be the largest shopping complex in East Kowloon and which, same as the private housing development of which it is a part, comprises three phases: MCP One (formerly Metro City Plaza Phase 1), MCP Central (formerly Metro City Plaza Phase 2) and MCP Discovery (formerly Metro City Plaza Phase 3).

Transport 
Po Lam Road North and Po Hong Road are two major roadways in the neighbourhood, with most of the developments sandwiched between them. Po Lam Road North is the extension of Po Lam Road, where the area of Po Lam got its name. Po Lam Road opened in 1956 to connect the Haven of Hope Tuberculosis Sanatorium (now Haven of Hope Hospital) to Tiu Keng Leng and Ma Yau Tong. During the Tseung Kwan O New Town development, Po Lam Road was extended eastward, into the new town, and westward, to Sau Mau Ping. The extension within the new town, which starts from Mau Wu Tsai Village and leads into Po Lam, was named Po Lam Road North. The other extension was still called Po Lam Road. The old section from Tiu Keng Leng to Ma Yau Tong was renamed to Po Lam Road South.

Public transportation in Po Lam is served by the MTRC, Kowloon Motor Bus (KMB), New World First Bus (NWFB) and Citybus. As with most areas in the New Territories and Kowloon, NWFB only operates routes to Hong Kong Island (cross-harbour routes), and Citybus only routes to the Hong Kong International Airport or Tung Chung. Citybus also operates a few cross-harbour routes to Central. KMB runs routes to Mei Foo, Tsim Sha Tsui East, Mong Kok and Tsuen Wan, among others. The MTRC only runs Tseung Kwan O line, on which Po Lam MTR station is the only rail and subway station in the neighbourhood. In the Railway Development Strategy 2014, the government proposed the East Kowloon line will connect Po Lam station to Diamond Hill station. It is expected to open in 2025.

Current District Councillors (2020-2023)

References 

 
Sai Kung District
Tseung Kwan O
Places in Hong Kong